At Ta'iziyah District is a district of the Taiz Governorate, Yemen. As of 2003, the district had a population of 109,814 inhabitants.

Sub-districts 
Ad-Da'aysah
Al-A'mur
Al-Aj'ud
Al-Esrar
Al-Hashamah
Al-Haymah al-Olya
Al-Haymah as-Sufla
Al-Ja'di
Al-Janadyah al-Olya
Al-Janadyah as-Sufla
Al-Masnah
Al-Qusaybah
Ar-Rubay'i
Ash-Sha'banyah al-Olya
Ash-Sha'banyah as-Sufla
Ash-Shuhnah
Az-Zawaqir
Hadhran
Mikhlaf Asfal
Qiyad

References

 
Districts of Taiz Governorate